This is a list of awards and nominations received by GFriend, a South Korean girl group formed by Source Music, since their debut in 2015. Their debut extended play Season of Glass, released in January 2015, won the group several new artist awards between late 2015 to early 2016, including at the 5th Gaon Chart Music Awards, the 30th Golden Disc Awards and the 25th Seoul Music Awards. The group received their first Grand Prize (Daesang) award at the 2016 Korea PD Awards.

The group's third extended play Snowflake single "Rough" won the group several awards between late 2016 to early 2017, including Song of the Year – January at the 7th Gaon Chart Music Awards. The single also won the Best Dance award and Digital Bonsang award at the 2016 Melon Music Awards, the 2016 Mnet Asian Music Awards and the 31st Golden Disc Awards, respectively.

Awards and nominations

Other accolades

Listicles

References

Awards
GFriend